Edward Francis "Rinty" Monahan (April 28, 1928 – July 27, 2003) was an American professional baseball player, a right-handed pitcher who played for the Philadelphia Athletics of Major League Baseball during August . In four career games pitched, all in relief, he had a 0–0 record, with a 4.22 earned run average.

He attended Niagara University and signed his first pro contract with the New York Giants in 1949. In 1952, his fourth year in the Giants' farm system, he won 17 games for the Class A Jacksonville Tars and was selected in the 1952 Rule 5 draft by the Athletics. He spent the entire 1953 campaign on the A's big-league roster, but worked in only four August games. In his most successful appearance, on August 16 at Connie Mack Stadium in the first game of a doubleheader, he pitched the final two innings against the eventual 1953 world champion New York Yankees, allowing only one hit (a single by Irv Noren), one base on balls and no runs. It was a "mop up" assignment, as the Yankees led Philadelphia 8–0 when Monahan was called on to pitch.

In his MLB career, Monahan allowed 11 hits and seven bases on balls in 10⅔ innings pitched, with two strikeouts. His pro career continued in the minor leagues in 1954 and 1957. He died in Brooklyn at age 75.

References

External links
Baseball Reference.com page

1928 births
2003 deaths
Baseball players from New York (state)
Burials at Green-Wood Cemetery
Jacksonville Tars players
Little Rock Travelers players
Major League Baseball pitchers
Niagara Purple Eagles baseball players
Oshkosh Giants players
Ottawa A's players
Philadelphia Athletics players
Savannah A's players
Shreveport Sports players
Sioux City Soos players
Sportspeople from Brooklyn
Baseball players from New York City
Trenton Giants players